Joseph Robert Kmak (May 3, 1963 in Napa, California) is an American former professional baseball player who played catcher in Major League Baseball from 1993–1995. He played for the Milwaukee Brewers and Chicago Cubs. He bats and throws right-handed. During his varsity career at Junípero Serra High School in San Mateo, California, Kmak grew up and played with Barry Bonds, where they won the 1980 West Catholic Athletic League Championship. He has also served as an assistant baseball coach at Junípero Serra.

References

External links

1963 births
Living people
Major League Baseball catchers
Milwaukee Brewers players
Chicago Cubs players
Charlotte Knights players
UC Santa Barbara Gauchos baseball players
Baseball players from California
People from Napa, California

Junípero Serra High School (San Mateo, California) alumni
Denver Zephyrs players
El Paso Diablos players
Everett Giants players
Fresno Giants players
Indianapolis Indians players
Iowa Cubs players
New Orleans Zephyrs players
Norfolk Tides players
Omaha Royals players
Reno Silver Sox players
Shreveport Captains players